Skellig is a 1998 children's novel by David Almond.

Skellig may also refer to:

Arts and entertainment
Skellig (film), a 2009 film based on the novel
Skellig, a 2008 opera by Tod Machover based on the novel
Skellig (album), by David Gray, 2021, and its title track
"Skellig", a song by Loreena McKennitt from the 1997 album The Book of Secrets

Other uses
 Skellig Islands, Kerry, Ireland
 Skellig Michael, or Great Skellig, the larger of the Skellig Islands
 Little Skellig, the smaller of the Skellig Islands
Skellig Rangers GAA, a Gaelic football team

See also
 "Sceilg", pen name of John J. O'Kelly (1872–1957)